Princess Ryan (born May 26, 1989) is a Filipina-Irish TV personality. She is currently a contact star with ABS-CBN and Star Magic.

Career

Princess started modeling at a young age and has appeared in several TV commercials such like Royal Tru-Orange, Greenwich, Palmolive and Globe.

Filmography

Television

1989 births
Living people
Filipino people of Irish descent
Star Magic
People from Southern Leyte
Filipino television actresses
21st-century Filipino actresses